Galerian may refer to:

Galerians, a 1999 horror video game
Galerian Mammal Age, a European land mammal age
Galerian tribe, the early people of Lugdunum (now Lyons, France)

See also
 Galeria (disambiguation)
 Galerina